Tawęcin  is a settlement in the administrative district of Gmina Cybinka, within Słubice County, Lubusz Voivodeship, in western Poland, close to the German border.

The settlement has a population of 20.

References

Villages in Słubice County